Melica rigida is a species of grass found in Argentina, Brazil (Santa Catarina, Rio Grande do Sul), and Uruguay.

Description
The species is perennial with short rhizomes. The leaf-sheaths are scabrous, tubular, closed on one end and are glabrous on surface. They also have scabrous margins and surface, the later one of which is rough. The main panicle branches are appressed with scaberulous and dominant axis.

Fertile spikelets have pedicels which are curved filiform, and scabrous. They also have 2 fertile florets which are diminished at the apex with its rhachilla internodes being scaberulous.

The species' palea have ciliolated keels, smooth surface and dentated apex. Flowers are fleshy, oblong and truncate. Fruits are dark brown in colour, have caryopsis and additional pericarp.

Ecology

References

rigida
Flora of Argentina
Flora of Brazil
Flora of Uruguay
Taxa named by Antonio José Cavanilles